Dad's Army
is a British sitcom about the Home Guard during the Second World War, produced by David Croft, and written by David Croft and Jimmy Perry. Set in the fictional seaside town of Walmington-on-Sea, located near Eastbourne, it follows a well-meaning platoon of men ineligible for active service as they serve as Britain's "last line of defence". The series was broadcast on BBC1 from 31 July 1968 to 13 November 1977, a total of 80 episodes spread over 9 series, including 3 Christmas specials and 3 missing episodes. 4 short Christmas sketches were also broadcast as part of Christmas Night with the Stars. The first 2 series (Series 1 to Series 2) were broadcast in black and white, from 31 July 1968 to 5 April 1969 and the next 7 series (Series 3 to Series 9) were broadcast in colour, from 11 September 1969 to 13 November 1977. Episodes ran for 30 minutes each, with some exceptions: the 1971 Christmas special "Battle of the Giants!" aired on 27 December 1971 ran for 60 minutes, the 1975 Christmas special "My Brother and I" aired on 26 December 1975 ran for 40 minutes and the final ever episode of Series 9 in 1977 "Never Too Old" aired on 13 November 1977 ran for 35 minutes.

5 episodes of series 2 were not retained by the BBC Archives, but two of those episodes, "Operation Kilt" and "The Battle of Godfrey's Cottage", were located in 2001. An audio recording of "A Stripe for Frazer", one of the three missing episodes, was discovered in 2008 and an animated version of it was released in February 2016. An episode of series 3, "Room at the Bottom", was broadcast in colour but only a black and white copy survives in the archives. The episode was restored in 2008 using colour recovery.

All interior studio scenes for the nine series, Christmas specials and the Christmas Night with the Stars specials were recorded in the BBC Television Centre in West London, where the production used many of the eight main television studios there, to record the show.

Many exterior scenes were filmed in a studio, but when location recordings were made, they were done in Norfolk, with the production team basing themselves in the small Norfolk town of Thetford.

Every Dad’s Army episode comprises the following cast members: Arthur Lowe (Captain George Mainwaring) John Le Mesurier (Sergeant Arthur Wilson), Clive Dunn (Lance Corporal Jack Jones), John Laurie (Private James Frazer), Arnold Ridley (Private Charles Godfrey) and Ian Lavender (Private Frank Pike) appeared in all 80 episodes of the wartime sitcom, ranging from "The Man and the Hour" in 1968 to "Never Too Old" in 1977, while James Beck (Private Joe Walker) appeared in 59 episodes leading up to his sudden death in 1973, ranging from "The Man and the Hour" in 1968 to "Things that Go Bump in the Night" in 1973.

Series Overview

Episodes

Black and White Series (1968-1969)

Series 1 (1968)

Series 2 (1969)

Colour Series (1969-1977)

Series 3 (1969)

Series 4 (1970)

Christmas Special (1971)

Series 5 (1972)

Series 6 (1973)

Series 7 (1974)

Series 8 (1975)

Christmas Specials (1975–1976)

Series 9 (1977)

Sketches and short films
Christmas Night with the Stars, broadcast annually on BBC One on Christmas Day, included sketches from Dad's Army in four years: 
 Untitled Christmas Short in 1968
 Resisting the Aggressor Down the Ages in 1969
 Cornish Floral Dance in 1970
 Broadcast to the Empire in 1972. 

The 1968 sketch was broadcast in black and white, and the others were broadcast in colour. The 1968 and 1970 sketches are lost from the BBC Archives but they survive in audio. The 1968 sketch ran for nine minutes. The 1969 sketch ran for twenty minutes, whilst the 1970 and 1972 sketches ran for ten minutes each.

The Cornish Floral Dance was again performed for the Royal Variety Performance of 1975. This version is extant and can be found online. 

In 1974 and 1977, the cast of Dad's Army appeared in-character for public information films commissioned by the Central Office of Information to instruct viewers how to successfully use pelican crossings.

References

Sources

Further reading

External links
Dad's Army homepage on the BBC website

 
Dad's Army
Lists of British sitcom episodes